My Ghost Partner,  is a 2012 Singaporean comedy film directed by Huang Yiliang.

Plot
Conmen Zhang Shi and Yi Fei are thrown into the sea after messing with the wrong guy. While Yi Fei survives, Zhang Shi drowns, and returns as a ghost.

Cast
 Huang Yiliang as Zhang Shi
 Brandon Wong as Yi Fei
 Dawn Yeoh
 Richard Low
 Carole Lin
 Nick Shen
 Yang Libing
 Sam Tseng

Release
The film was initially meant to be released in either April or May 2012. It was released in theatres in Singapore on 30 August 2012.

Reception
Li Yiyun of Lianhe Zaobao rated the film two-and-a-half stars out of five for entertainment and two stars out of five for art. Kwok Kar Peng of The New Paper rated the film one-and-a-half stars out of five, praising the performances, while criticising the plot, calling it "old-fashioned", and described the ending as being a "terrible cliche". Boon Chan of The Straits Times rated the movie one-and-a-half stars out of five, writing "Fatal flaws aside, My Ghost Partner could have been a mildly amusing comedy if it had focused on Shi and Fei's partnership. But with multiple plotlines and a whole bunch of familiar small-screen faces including Dawn Yeoh, Nick Shen, Yang Libing, Carole Lin and even Taiwan's Sam Tseng, it feels too scattered."

References

2012 films
Singaporean comedy films